Laughing gas, or nitrous oxide, is a colorless, non-flammable gas.

Laughing gas may also refer to:
 Laughing Gas (novel), a 1936 novel by P.G. Wodehouse
 Laughing Gas (1914 film), a film starring Charlie Chaplin
 Laughing Gas (film), several movie shorts
 "Laughing Gas" (instrumental), a song by Quiet Riot
 Reggie Attache (1894–1955), Native American professional football player nicknamed Laughing Gas